The Republika Srpska 2012–13 was tenth season of the Republika Srpska national football tournament.

The competition started on 19 September 2012, and got concluded on 2 June 2013. FK Borac Banja Luka were the defending champions, while FK Radnik Bijeljina were the new champions after defeating Borac in the final.

Calendar

Draw

The draws for the round of 32 was conducted in Banja Luka at 12:00 (CEST) on 6 September 2012. All 31 clubs were in the same pot, resulting that every club could get any other club as his opponent. The first-drawn team served as hosts.

Competition

Round of 32
This round consisted of 16 single-legged fixtures. All 31 clubs entered the competition from this round, while the matches were played on 12 September 2012.  In case of a draw in the regular time, the winner would have been determined with a penalty shootout.

West

 Free team Proleter

East

 Free team Radnik (B)

Round of 16
This round consisted of 8 single-legged fixtures. The date for the matches were determined with the draw which was held on October 4 . The matches took place on October 10.  In a case of a draw in the regular time, the winner would have been determined with a penalty shootout.

Quarterfinals
This round consisted of 4 single-legged fixtures. The date for the matches were determined with the draw which was held on October 25 . The matches took place on November 7.  In a case of a draw in the regular time, the winner would have been determined with a penalty shootout.

Semifinals
The four winners from the previous round played their opponents in this last hurdle before the final. The semifinals consisted of two two-legged fixtures. The first leg took part on 17 April, while the second leg was played on 15 May 2013.

|}

 two legs
 away goals rule applied if score is level after 180 minutes
 penalties used if needed, no extra-time

Final

The final will be contested between Borac Banja Luka and Radnik on 30 May and 2 June 2013.

|}

Source: FS RS

 two legs
 away goals rule applied if score is level after 180 minutes
 penalties used if needed, no extra-time
  Crvena Zemlja withdrawal

Republika Srpska Cup
Republika Srpska Cup